North Lake Road is a major road in the southwestern suburbs of the Perth metropolitan area functioning as an intermediate arterial collector positioned between the limited-access Stock Road to the west and Kwinana Freeway to the east. North Lake Road's northern terminus is at Canning Highway with its southern end at Armadale Road with the Kwinana Freeway exit as of December 2021. North Lake Road was part of the old State Route 14 until the early 2010s when upgrades and extensions to the more south-westerly Spearwood Avenue and Beeliar Drive resulted in its status being revoked.

North Lake Road varies between a four to six-lane dual carriageway except for a two lane section north of Marmion Street. The northbound carriageway is three lanes between Leach Highway and Winterfold Road while the southbound's three lane section is longer but further south between Somerville Boulevard and Phoenix Road.

History
North Lake Road was developed in the late 19th Century in line with the wider City of Melville area. It was the main northern access road to the Beeliar Wetlands, particularly Bibra Lake, with two smaller lakes to the north and south. North Lake Road terminated at an intersection with Forrest Road, at the time the main west–east road connection between Fremantle and Armadale and followed the now defunct Spearwood–Armadale railway line. North Lake Road also marked the western boundary of a pine plantation owned by the University of Western Australia.

As Perth expanded southwards in the 1970-1980s a new corridor was developed to the west of the existing route to cater for the expected development of residential areas in suburbs such as Winthrop, Kardinya and Coolbellup, industrial and tourism developments in the suburb of Bibra Lake while at the same time also trying to relocate heavy traffic away from the wetlands. In the 1990s the extension of the Kwinana Freeway severed the original Forrest Road connection. The name North Lake Road would be used as the western section from the original terminus at Forrest Road and would curve south to the realigned intersection with the newly constructed Beeliar Drive. The section east of the freeway would be renamed to Armadale Road. The renaming effectively doubled the length of North Lake Road as a result.

By 2008, the remaining sections of the renamed North Lake Road were a single carriageway from Beeliar Drive to Hammond Road and again from Bibra Drive to Discovery Drive. In 2009, the northern section (Bibra to Discovery) upgraded to a dual carriageway. In the early 2010s, North Lake Road had its state route status revoked and was passed on further to Beeliar Drive and then to Spearwood Avenue, which was then-recently extended. Despite the revocation the road would continue to see major upgrades. In 2013, North Lake Road would be realigned southeast of Kentucky Court to terminate just west of the Kwinana Freeway and recurve to provide bus-only access to the Cockburn Central railway station. The original southern alignment was four-laned and renamed Midgegooroo Avenue. The remaining section between Midgegoroo Avenue and Hammond Road was duplicated in 2016. In late 2021 a half-diamond interchange and flyover was built to provide direct access to the Kwinana Freeway and Armadale Road, in effect restoring the old Forrest Road connection severed nearly 30 years ago.

The old North Lake Road alignment, between Archibald Street in Willagee and Elderberry Drive in South Lake, remains as a set of mostly discontinuous local roads.
 Freedman Way from Archibald Street to Somerville Boulevard.
 Gilbertson Road from Somerville Boulevard to Farrington Road
 Progress Drive from Farrington Road to Bibra Drive
 Prout Way from Bibra Drive to the Kwinana freight railway
 Little Rush Close from the Kwinana freight railway to Elderberry Drive

Major Intersections
All intersections listed are controlled by traffic signals unless otherwise indicated.

References

Roads in Perth, Western Australia